Waldemar Kraft (19 February 1898 – 12 July 1977) was a German politician. A member of the SS in Nazi Germany, he served as  Managing Director of the Reich Association for Land Management in the Annexed Territories from 1940 to 1945, administering parts of occupied Poland. After the war, he became a West German politician, sitting in the Landtag of Schleswig-Holstein from 1950 to 1953 and serving as Minister of Finance. He entered the Bundestag in 1953 and served as Federal Minister for Special Affairs in the Cabinet of Chancellor Konrad Adenauer from 1953 to 1956. He retired from the Bundestag in 1961.

Kraft initially represented the All-German Bloc/League of Expellees and Deprived of Rights and served as its chairman from 1951 to 1954. In 1956, he became a member of the Christian Democratic Union.

Education and profession

Waldemar Kraft was born to a Protestant German family in Brzustow, Jarotschin district, in the Province of Posen on the Prussian-Russian border (today Brzostów, Poland). He attended secondary school in pre-1914 Posen, focusing his secondary school studies on agriculture. Between 1915 and 1920 he was a soldier of the Prussian Army and participated in World War I, where he was severely wounded. Afterwards he served as a company commander.

From 1939 to 1940 he served as the regional President of Agriculture (the ) in Nazi Posen. Shortly before the war ended this Reich Association, and Kraft, moved to Ratzeburg in Schleswig-Holstein. From 1945 to 1947 he was interned in Schleswig-Holstein and remained unemployed in Ratzeburg to 1950.

As such he signed the Charter of the German expellees and later became honorary chairman (an ).

Political affiliation
Kraft joined the NSDAP in 1943(membership number 9.428.904). On 13 November 1939, immediately following the Nazi invasion of Poland and the incorporation of his region into the Warthegau, he was also appointed an Hauptsturmführer or Honorary Captain of SS.

In 1951 he was elected national chairman of the League and Eva Gräfin Finck von Finckenstein became his press secretary. In September 1954 she was not reelected into the League administrative board, which led to the resignation of Waldemar Kraft as Chairman.

In March 1956 Kraft, Finckenstein and Theodor Oberländer joined the CDU, which led to the decline of influence of the All-German Bloc/League of Expellees and Deprived of Rights in German politics.

MP
From 1950 to 1953 Kraft was a member of the state parliament of Schleswig-Holstein, where he represented the electoral district of Lauenburg-west. From 1953 to 1961 he was subsequently elected a member of the West German Bundestag.

After the elections in 1953 he retired on 20 October 1953 from the State Government and was appointed on the same day as the Federal Minister without Portfolio under government of Chancellor Konrad Adenauer in Bonn. On 16 October 1956 he resigned from the federal government.

He died in Bonn in 1977.

Evaluation
A committed CDU stalwart after World War II and champion of the rights of the Germans expelled from Poland, British historian Richard Grunberger cited him as an example of the permeation or infiltration of SS attitudes and values into mainstream postwar West German society and politics. Opinion revolves around his involvement in the SS, but it is unclear whether Kraft volunteered for the SS-Ehrenführer post at his own initiative or to advance his career or whether he was pressured to do so by his immediate superiors. Both the Minister for Agriculture, Richard Walther Darré, and the Gauleiter of Warthegau, Arthur Greiser, were senior and important SS officers and that may have influenced Kraft.

See also
List of German Christian Democratic Union politicians

References

Literature
 Rainer Salzmann, Kraft, Waldemar. In: Neue Deutsche Biographie (NDB). Band 12, Duncker & Humblot, Berlin 1980, p. 655/656.
 Waldemar Kraft. In: Kanzler und Minister 1949-1998. Biografisches Lexikon der deutschen Bundesregierungen, ed. by Udo Kempf and Hans-Georg Merz, Wiesbaden: Westdeutscher Verlag,  2001, pp. 380–384.
 Richard Grunberger, Hitler's SS (1970), page.114.
 "Schütze Kraft" in Der Spiegel (19 May 1954)

                   

1898 births
1977 deaths
People from Jarocin County
People from the Province of Posen
German Protestants
Nazi Party politicians
All-German Bloc/League of Expellees and Deprived of Rights politicians
Christian Democratic Union of Germany politicians
German Army personnel of World War I
Grand Crosses 1st class of the Order of Merit of the Federal Republic of Germany